The 61st Naval Infantry Brigade (Military Unit Number 38643) is a formation of the Russian Naval Infantry. It is part of the Northern Fleet Naval Infantry and Coastal Defence Force. The brigade is based in the Sputnik military settlement, located in Murmansk Oblast. Some sources consider it one of the best trained and most combat experienced units of the Russian military.

History 
The brigade was established on 20 November 1979 from the 61st Separate Naval Infantry Regiment. The regiment was activated at Sputnik on 14May 1966 from the 61st Motor Rifle Regiment of the 131st Motor Rifle Division.

Soldiers of the 61st Naval Infantry Brigade fought in 1995 in First and in 1999–2000 in the Second Chechen War. On 1December 2009, the brigade was downsized to a regiment with the same designation. It became a brigade again on 15December 2014.

In 2014, according to an investigation published by Bellingcat, marines of the 61st Naval Infantry Brigade participated in the War in Donbass in the Luhansk region of Ukraine. Brigade personnel and vehicles, including the brigade's exotic 2S23 Nona-SVK, were spotted on the territory of the Ukrainian National Guard's military base (3035) in Luhansk. Evidences shows the brigade's direct participation in combat near Vishnevy Dol village in the Luhansk region.

Upon returning home, the marines took a trophy BRDM armored vehicle back to Murmansk. At least 5 soldiers received decorations, which included the Zhukov Medal, the Order of Suvorov and the Order of Courage. Brigade Lieutenant Colonel Vitaly Trofimov was reportedly killed in Ukraine.

In March 2016, the 61st Naval Infantry Brigade conducted operations in which it aided the Syrian Army taking the Syrian city of Palmyra. The 61st also participated in the storming of the city. Despite other Russian forces being more available for the operation, the 61st Brigade was chosen for the operation because it was considered one of the best trained and most combat experienced units of the Russian military.

As of February 2022, elements of the Brigade were reported to have deployed to the Black Sea as part of an amphibious task force participating in the invasion of Ukraine. On 7 March the Ukrainian military claimed to have killed Lieutenant Colonel Dmitry Safronov, commander of the brigade's Marine Battalion, in action near Kharkiv.

Organisation and order of battle 
 Brigade Headquarters
 874th Marine Battalion
 876th Air-Assault (Desant) Battalion
 886th Reconnaissance Battalion
 125th Armored Battalion
 1611th Self-propelled Artillery Battalion
 1591st Self-propelled Artillery Battalion
 1617th Anti-aircraft Missile and Artillery Battalion

Commanders 
The following officers commanded this unit:

Commanders of the 61st Infantry Regiment:
 Y. P. Pidust: 1944–1948;
 I. S. Matveev : 1948–1950;
 A. P. Vorobyov : 1950–1952;
 M. P. Davydov : 1952–1954;
 P. S. Lopatkin : 1954–1955;
 V. G. Solovyov : 1955–1956;
 B.C. Zatoka : 1956–1957.
Commanders of the 61st Motor Rifle Regiment:
 M. I. Belov : 1957–1959;
 V. I. Varennikov : 1959–1960;
 A. A. Fomichev : 1960–1965.
Commanders of the 61st Marine Regiment:
 V. A. Krukovsky : 1965–1967;
 A. F. Pakhomov : 1967–1974;
 N. B. Polyakov : 1974–1979;
Commanders of the 61st Marine Brigade:
 A. E. Ermakov : 1979–1984;
 A. S. Pustoutov : 1984–1988;
 A. N. Borzenko : 1988–1990;
 Y. M. Shakalov : 1990–1993;
 B. F. Sokushev : 1993–1995;
 G. S. Semyonov : 1995–1999;
 A. V. Chernov : 1999–2002;
 N. I. Klimov : 2002–2005;
 A. V. Sorogin : 2005–2008;
 M. K. Magomedzhanov : 2008–2010.
Commander of the 61st Marine Regiment:
 A. V. Maslov : 2010-2014
Commanders of the 61st Marine Brigade:
 A. V. Maslov : 2014-2016
 V. V. Fedyanin† : 2016–30.09.2017 (died of wound in Syria)
 K. N. Nikulin : 2018–present

Notes 

Naval infantry brigades of Russia
Military units and formations of Russia in the war in Donbas
Military units and formations of the 2022 Russian invasion of Ukraine